Bhagwan Sahay  (15 February 1905 – 6 December 1986) was the Governor of Kerala, India, from 6 February 1966 to 15 May 1967. Bhagwan Sahay took over as the Governor of Jammu and Kashmir on 15 May 1967 and continued till 3 July 1973. He was an ICS officer and an alumnus of the S.M College in Chandausi, Moradabad and became the second alumni of that College, after his immediate predecessor Ajit Prasad Jain, to become governor of Kerala. Before his stint in Kerala, he was also the Lieutenant Governor of Punjab. In the 1970s, under President VV Giri, a former governor of Kerala himself, he headed the committee of governors which sought to outline guidelines for constitutional heads.

He was awarded the Padma Bhushan, and was appointed an OBE in the 1945 Birthday Honours. He was the younger brother of former Assam Governor Vishnu Sahay.

References

External links
List of Kerala governors

1905 births
1986 deaths
Governors of Kerala
Indian Officers of the Order of the British Empire
Recipients of the Padma Bhushan in civil service
People from Chandausi